The city of Dubuque, Iowa stretches back over 200 years, when Julien Dubuque first settled in the area in the late 18th century.

Early years
Dubuque was the first permanent European settlement in what would become the state of Iowa.  This area was important in the French-Indian fur trading culture; the earliest record of lead mining dates to 1690 and the French trader, Nicholas Perrot. In 1788, Julien Dubuque was granted rights by the Mesquakie Indians to mine their land for lead; he settled near the mouth of Catfish Creek. Dubuque, for whom the city is named, is considered to be the first white man to settle in Iowa.  Julien Dubuque's tomb remains a local landmark.

In 1833, the area where Julien Dubuque settled and worked was opened up to settlement by the United States Government.  Miners created a settlement, this settlement eventually became the city of Dubuque. The religious community began with St. Luke's United Methodist Church. It is the oldest Methodist church in the state. Its origins trace back to the founding of the city; when Methodist ministers arrived and began work with the miners of the time. This was the first congregation of any denomination west of the Mississippi River. A small Catholic parish was established 1833. It eventually became the Saint Raphael's Cathedral parish.  A Catholic church council recommended to the pope that three new dioceses be created, one of which was at Dubuque.  In 1837, the Dubuque Diocese was created, and Mathias Loras was appointed as a bishop.  When he arrived in Dubuque, there were only a few priests to cover a large area that consisted of several states.

Immigration
Bishop Loras encouraged large numbers of immigrants to come to the area from the crowded cities in the eastern US.  Many immigrants settled in Dubuque and the surrounding area.  Also, immigrants tended to gather with other immigrants from the same ethnic background, this often helped with their assimilation into their new nation.

Many Irish families came to the area because of their desire for a fresh start from the poor conditions in Ireland, and the crowded conditions in the east.  For many years, Irish families mainly settled in the southern parts of the city - that area was often referred to as Little Dublin.

They were followed by a small group of Germans.  However, over the years the German population grew until Germans became one of the two main ethnic groups in the city.

While other groups—such as Hispanics and African Americans—have become more prominent over the years, many living in Dubuque are descendants of German and Irish immigrants.

The Civil War

A number of people living in Dubuque served their nation in this war.  A few of these people went on to play an important role in government.  David Bremner Henderson (1840–1906) was a Representative in the US House, and was Speaker at the turn of the century.  He was wounded in the war and lost a leg.  William Boyd Allison (1829–1908) also served in the war.  Afterwards, he later served in both houses of Congress. Allison Henderson park on the corners of University Avenue and Grandview Avenue is named for the two men.

A few Dubuque citizens found themselves in trouble with the government during the war.  George Wallace Jones (1804–1896) was imprisoned on a charge of disloyalty based upon correspondence with Jefferson Davis. Newspaper publisher Dennis Mahony was also imprisoned for several months in 1862 for editorials that were critical of the government.

Many Catholics and immigrants in Dubuque were opposed to the Republican party because parts of the Know Nothings movement who had harassed them had been absorbed into the Republican party.  It caused trouble for both groups when the President and other government officials misinterpreted this opposition as disloyalty.  This was responsible, in part, for Dubuque becoming a stronghold for the Democratic party.

After the Civil War

The years following the war were ones of growth and expansion for Dubuque.  When the Milwaukee Railroad Shops opened in Dubuque, a population explosion occurred when a number of young German families moved to the area in search of jobs.

Lead mining no longer played a central role in the city.  Now Dubuque was becoming a transportation center due to its position on the Mississippi River.  Also, the lumber industry had a large presence in Dubuque.

The Ku Klux Klan was an unwelcome presence at times in the area.  In the 1920s, at the height of its power, Klan influence became visible in the area.  Several crosses were burned in the area over an 18-month time period.  One Klan meeting near the Center Grove section of the city degenerated into a huge fight when anti-klan demonstrators attacked Klan members.  In 1925, the Klan held a gathering which they called a "Konklave."  The Klan claimed over 50,000 people attended the rally.  The Klan held another "Konklave" as well as a parade.

Fortunately, the influence of the Klan soon began to weaken.  National scandals and power struggles weakened the Klan, which was mirrored locally.  The Klan had pretty much disappeared from the public view for a number of years.

Most recently, during the 1990s, there was a brief resurgence of the Klan's presence in Dubuque. Appropriate actions were taken and the Klan's presence has since disappeared.

World War II and Aftermath
One of the first casualties of the Second World War was Father Aloysius Schmitt.  A Roman Catholic priest and Chaplain, the Iowa native had been educated at Loras College in Dubuque, and had served as a pastor at St. Mary's Church in Dubuque.

Following the war, Deere and Company built their manufacturing plant on a parcel of land adjoining the Mississippi River north of Dubuque.  This plant, which today builds construction equipment became one of the major employers in the Dubuque area.

As television gained in popularity, area residents found that the geography of Dubuque made reception of over the air television signals difficult in some parts of the city.  In response, a cable television system was developed in Dubuque during the mid-1950s.  This made the Dubuque cable system one of the earlier systems to be developed in the country.  The development of the Dubuque cable system meant that most homes in the lower lying regions of the city did not have television antennas - which was one of the main reasons why the city was chosen as a location for the movie F.I.S.T..  Without TV antennas, Dubuque at the time looked more like Cleveland of the 1930s than Cleveland did.  Today Mediacom runs the Dubuque cable system.

The Great Depression
Dubuque was also affected by the Great Depression that had affected the rest of the nation.  Many people were forced to move into what were called Hoovervilles.  The one in Dubuque was in the southern part of the city.

The floods

The city was the site of several disastrous floods over the years when the Mississippi River went over its banks.

Many older residents of Dubuque remember the Flood of 1965 as one of the worst in the city's history.  Many areas of downtown Dubuque were under several feet of water, which resulted in damage or destruction of homes and businesses in the path of the floods.  Only sandbagging efforts of local citizens kept the main highways open to keep traffic flowing.

Following the 1965 flood funds were sought from the Federal government for the installation of a floodwall.  This floodwall was finally built in the late 1960s.  When the entire midwest was prone to widespread floods in 1993 the floodwall helped keep the city from experiencing serious flooding, while other cities - such as Davenport, Iowa - sustained major damage.

In 1999, a major flood devastated Dubuque prompting the city to take action against them. The most notable action was the "daylighting" of the Bee Branch Creek.

Movies
In the late 1970s, the movie F.I.S.T. was filmed in Dubuque.  Sylvester Stallone starred in this film as a trucker who compromises his principles as he moves up through the labor union organization.  Dubuque was chosen because without TV antennas it looked more like Cleveland of the 1930s than Cleveland did.

In between came Take This Job and Shove It, a movie starring Robert Hays and Art Carney that was filmed at the old Dubuque Star Brewery.

In the late 1980s Field of Dreams was filmed.  Parts of the movie were filmed in Dubuque, as well as the nearby towns of Dyersville and Galena, Illinois.  The movie starred Kevin Costner, Amy Madigan, Gaby Hoffmann, James Earl Jones, Ray Liotta, and Burt Lancaster.  Both well known Hollywood actors, and members of the community were cast as extras.

Racial problems
In the early 1990s the city experienced racial strife that attracted national attention.

The problems began when a cross was burned next to the garage of an African-American family which caught fire. In the ruins, parts of the cross were found, with the inscription "KKK Lives."  Another cross was burned a few weeks later.  This was found to be the work of a group of young men who were well known racists - several members already had criminal records.  Those responsible eventually were convicted and sent to prison.

At about the same time, the city embarked on a plan to encourage more minorities to move to the area.  Some of the critics tried to stir up fear by telling people that the city was planning on taking a bus to a large city and grab the first 100 African-Americans that they found.  In reality, the city was planning on making a recruiting drive to bring African-American professionals to the city.

The city's program, and the cross burning polarized the community.  People took up strongly held views.  Dubuque police had to be summoned to Dubuque's Senior High School at one point because racial tensions almost boiled over into a large fight at the school.  Jim Brady, who was mayor at the time, had even gone to the schools in Dubuque to talk about his experiences with racism over the years.  When the Guardian Angels arrived in Dubuque, it was felt that their presence would only complicate the matter.  Brady flat out told them that if they caused problems he'd have them arrested.

The cross burnings and the city's plans had the effect of bringing negative media attention to the city.  ABC's 20/20 did a news segment on race relations, which many felt was biased against the city and the people living in it in general.  An episode of Donahue featured some of the major personalities in the controversy.

The problems also attracted the unwelcome attention of hate groups.  One hate group held a parade through the city, which was attended by only a few hundred people.  The Ku Klux Klan held a rally in downtown Dubuque.  To counter the Klan rally, the city held a free diversity public gathering at Dubuque's Eagle Point Park.

In 2007 racial tension have heated up once again after the stabbing of a white male in downtown Dubuque by a group of African-Americans at a party.

Traffic improvements
In recent years, government bodies from the Federal to the City level have moved to improve the road and highway systems in Dubuque, which have been plagued by problems that resulted from the original design of the roadways throughout the city.

US 61/151
One of the first major traffic improvement projects undertaken was to build a US 61/151 elevated highway through the city.  Previously, U.S. Highways 61/151 used several downtown roads from Locust Street up to the Wisconsin border.  This resulted in a lot of heavy truck traffic on local streets, and was a cause of major congestion.

In several stages from 1988 to 1993, a new four-lane divided highway was built through the city of Dubuque.  The sections were built from south to north.  Most of this new highway was designed as an elevated highway - except for one section near the riverfront.  Highway planners went ahead with this despite opposition over having an elevated highway through the city.  Initially the highway was planned as a complete limited access roadway with no at-grade intersections.  But after a campaign by local business interests, the design was changed so that there would be two at-grade traffic lights near the riverfront.  The approach to the Dubuque-Wisconsin Bridge was rebuilt to accommodate the new highway.

In 1993, the new US 61/151 highway was completed.  The highway has helped to reduce much of the congestion in downtown Dubuque.  Heavy trucks that are merely going through the city are now able to use the highway instead of local roads.  Travel from the southern to the northern ends of the route - once at least a 20-minute journey - has been at least cut in half.

Four lane expansion on highways 61 and 151 elsewhere in Iowa has given Dubuque four lane connections to both the Quad Cities and Cedar Rapids, Iowa.  With the completion of this expansion of U.S. 61 in the mid-1990s the city finally had a direct four lane connection to Interstate 80.

As part of the U.S. 151 expansion project, the highway was expanded to four lanes between Dubuque and Madison, Wisconsin.  Construction was finally finished in 2005, which resulted in a direct four lane connection between the two cities.

Bypasses
In the 1980s, the Northwest Arterial project was begun. It was intended to serve as a bypass around Dubuque, going northeast from US 20 at the west end of Dubuque out to US 52 / State Highway 3 north.

Initially, a four lane section from US Highway 20 up to JFK Road was graded. However, only two lanes were brought to completion. In the 1990s, the other two lanes were completed, and several stoplights were added to the road. In the late 1990s, Dubuque turned control of the road over to the state, who then named the road as State Highway 32.  At that point, the Northwest Arterial was expanded from JFK Road out to US 52. As a result, there is now a four lane bypass of Dubuque to the north. With the completion of the Northwest Arterial, more and more businesses are locating their operations along the highway. And the number of houses located near the Northwest Arterial has greatly increased over the past 15 years.

For a number of years, the Southwest Arterial, a bypass from the south to the west end of Dubuque, had been planned. However, the Southwest Arterial had for years not proceeded from the design stages.  Business leaders had voiced concern about not having such a bypass. Some people had taken to driving over secondary roads to avoid Dodge Street. As these roads - particularly Kelly Lane and Cedar Cross Road - are mainly residential streets, the lack of the bypass had caused concern among residents who saw traffic getting heavier all the time on those roads, along with safety problems such traffic brings. The Southwest Arterial was finally constructed and opened to traffic in 2020, carrying a realigned US 52.

Westward migration
During the latter half of the 20th century, residents and businesses of Dubuque began migrating out primarily to the western part of the city.  This movement has changed the face of many areas of the city, and pushed out the western borders of Dubuque.  Many homes and businesses were built on areas that were once farm fields in "the middle of nowhere."

Following World War II, the baby boom impacted Dubuque.  A number of these young families settled in the west end.  Areas that were once fields were turned into housing for these young families, and Dubuque began pushing westward.  Because of this, the Archdiocese of Dubuque opened Wahlert High School - a central parochial high school.  The Dubuque Community School District opened Hempstead High School - the city's second public high school - in 1970.

During this time, a number of new businesses were established in Dubuque.  The S. S. Kresge Corporation opened a new Kmart on a parcel of land on what was once the western border of Dubuque.  This was the first Kmart in Iowa.  Target Stores opened their own location about a mile west of Kmart it the late 1970s. In 1970 the first stores at Kennedy Mall - the first indoor, climate-controlled mall in Iowa - were opened.

A number of businesses moved to the western part of the city.  In 1964, Montgomery Ward decided to move their store from the downtown out to the west end. Both Wards and Roshek's Department Store moved into Kennedy Mall when it was opened. In the 1980s, both JCPenney and Sears moved their stores from the downtown out to Kennedy Mall.

This westward migration had redefined the lower main street area.  Instead of being the main shopping area of the city, it became mostly a business park.  After hours and on weekends, the area was deserted.  The city has made a number of efforts to increase the importance of the downtown area once again.

City redevelopment efforts
In recent years, the city of Dubuque has made a concerted effort to redevelop the downtown and riverfront areas.  This included a number of controversial decisions.  But so far most people seem to have positive opinions of the redevelopment efforts.

In the downtown area, the gas station featured in Field of Dreams was torn down to make way for expanded parking spots for downtown businesses.  In the years following that decision, the Bricktown Restaurant opened in the building behind the gas station after the owners made major improvements to the building.  The local Historic Preservation Commission had recommended that the gas station remain intact, however the city government overrode their decision.

The Merchant's Hotel - despite being a National Historic Landmark, was demolished to make way for a new building for the chamber of commerce.  This was a very controversial decision.  People interested in historic preservation felt that the building was worth saving.  However, the Merchants Hotel building was allowed to deteriorate until it was unsafe and structurally unsound.  It was also considered an eyesore.  The historic preservation interests were not able to put forth an effective plan to save the building, so it was demolished.  The chamber of commerce then built a modern building that was designed to blend in with its neighbors.

The city placed a new parking ramp behind the chamber of commerce building.  Unfortunately, this caused structural damage to several nearby buildings, including the old German National Bank Building.  The city worked to encourage the owner to repair the building and reopen the Silver Dollar Cantina - which he had to close when it didn't survive a massive fire. (See Dubuque365.com for info and pictures). The city threatened to cite the owner with demolition by neglect as he had not made repairs, but he started the process of rebuilding. As of March, 2008, the Silver Dollar is open for business once again.

A number of redevelopment efforts focused on the riverfront just north of the Ice Harbor.  This was part of the America's River project.  It included a newly expanded National Mississippi River Museum and Aquarium.  Private investors built the Grand River Hotel and Waterpark on the riverfront.  The Grand River Events Center was built next door as a place to host events for parties ranging from very small to very large parties.  The nearby old Dubuque Star Brewery has also been renovated into spaces for businesses.

Developers proposed building a stadium near the Ice Harbor for a minor league baseball team, however the plans were abandoned when a tax levy to help fund this stadium was voted down by the residents.

Developers have also recently begun construction efforts on the area at the bottom of the bluffs which the Eagle Point Park is located on.  They plan to build condominiums at the base of the bluffs.  This has caused controversy in that people feel that having buildings there would take away from the natural beauty of the area.  The controversy gained further momentum when it was found that several rockslides had taken place after construction efforts had begun.  The rockslides led to concern that construction efforts may be causing geological instability in the bluffs.

The Dubuque Community School District has decided to replace a downtown elementary school building with a new building a short distance away. This plan has run into opposition by historic preservation interests, who claim this would result in the destruction of several historic buildings. After considering the options, the district decided to go ahead with building the new school, and has purchased the properties to be demolished. A section of W. 12th street has been closed off. The street has been taken out to make way for the new school building, named Prescott Elementary.

The development of new hotels has led to what the industry has termed as a surplus in the market - especially with the addition of the Grand Harbor Hotel and a new Hilton hotel at the Dubuque Greyhound Park and Casino.  Because of this the Best Western Dubuque Inn has been sold.  Part of it was torn down, and the remaining portion is being remodeled into a new hotel scheduled to open in the spring of 2006.  The Dubuque Inn's owners also own the local Days Inn, which they have put up for sale as well.  The owners of those two properties have said that their occupancy was often less than 50%.

The 2004 Campaign
On May 7, 2004, President George W. Bush visited the city.  He is the first sitting President to have visited the city since Jimmy Carter in 1979.  While some were excited to have a sitting President in the city, others reacted with mixed feelings - especially when most of those allowed to attend a speech by Bush were only those who planned on voting for him in November.  Among those in attendance was former Iowa Hawkeyes Football Head Coach, Hayden Fry, who spoke about his friendship with George H. W. Bush and Barbara Bush in Texas and introduced the President to the standing room only crowd.  A World War II veteran who was denied tickets by campaign staffers only added to the controversy.  Bush returned to Dubuque on October 26, 2004 to attend another campaign rally at the Grand River Event Center.

Democratic Presidential candidate John Kerry also visited the city several times during his campaign.  On July 3, 2004, Kerry watched the fireworks celebration that evening from a private boat sitting in the Mississippi River.  On July 4, he attended a Catholic mass at Resurrection Church with Iowa Governor Tom Vilsack.  Despite some speculation to the contrary, he was able to receive communion.  He then continued on to visit several other communities in Iowa, including Cascade, and Cedar Rapids.  On August 3, 2004, Kerry again visited the city, and spoke to a large crowd at the Five Flags Center.  From Dubuque, he went to another campaign stop at Davenport, Iowa.

In the days leading up to the election, there was considerable controversy among Catholics on how to vote.  Some felt that with Kerry's pro-choice stance that Catholics should not vote for Kerry.  Other Catholics - despite the fact that they opposed Kerry's stance on abortion committed to voting for him.  These Catholics often pointed to the seamless garment idea espoused by the late Cardinal Joseph Bernardin, and felt that when a person looked at all the issues that Kerry was the better candidate for office.  Or people would take an "anyone but Bush" stance.  Both parties took out full page advertisements in the Telegraph Herald. appealing to Catholics to vote for either Bush or Kerry.  Officially, the Archdiocese maintained the traditional position that protection of the unborn is the most important and root issue in the tree of politics, as stated by Pope Benedict XVI.

Recent events
From June 27 to the June 29, 2004, Dubuque hosted the Grand Excursion.  This excursion - which ran from the Quad Cities to the Twin Cities made a stop at Dubuque.  This brought several riverboats participating in the event, a steam locomotive passenger train, the Budweiser Clydesdales, and a large number of people to the city.

In 2007, 2012, 2013, 2017, and 2019 Dubuque won an All-America City Award.

References

Further reading
 Johnson, Russell L. Warriors into Workers: The Civil War and the Formation of the Urban-Industrial Society in a Northern City (2003) about Dubuque

External links
Encyclopedia Dubuque
Oscar Wilde lectures in Dubuque, 1882

Dubuque
Dubuque, Iowa